Wāzakhwā District is a district of Paktika Province, Afghanistan. The district center is Wazakhwa. In 2019 the estimated population was 45,843. The district is within the heartland of the Sulaimankhel tribe of Ghilji Pashtuns.

References

Districts of Paktika Province